Stuart James (born 1978) is an Australian politician.

Stuart James may also refer to:

 Stuart James Campbell (born 1958), English builder convicted of abduction and murder of Danielle Jones
 Stuart Andrew (born 1971), Welsh politician
 Stuart Etherington (born 1955), British charity executive and former social worker